Mendejin (also Romanized as Mendejīn and Mendājīn; also known as Mīndajīn, Mindedzhin, and Mindejīn) is a village in Kaghazkonan-e Markazi Rural District, Kaghazkonan District, Meyaneh County, East Azerbaijan Province, Iran. At the 2006 census, its population was 72, in 23 families.

References 

Populated places in Meyaneh County